Azize is a Turkish female given name. Notable people with the name include:

 Azize Erdoğan (born 1996), Turkish women's football player
 Azize Hlali (born 1989), French-Moroccan Muay Thai fighter
 Azize Raguig (born 1975), Moroccan boxer
 Azize Tanrıkulu (born 1986), Turkish taekwondo athlete

Turkish feminine given names